Raven Klaasen and Rajeev Ram were the two-time defending champions, but lost to Alexander and Mischa Zverev in the semifinals.

Łukasz Kubot and Marcelo Melo won the title, defeating the Zverev brothers in the final, 5–7, 6–3, [10–8].

Seeds

Draw

Draw

Qualifying

Seeds

Qualifiers
  Andre Begemann /  Tim Pütz

Qualifying draw

References
 Main Draw
 Qualifying Draw

2017 Gerry Weber Open